CFexpress is a standard for removable media cards proposed by the CompactFlash Association (CFA). The standard uses the NVM Express protocol over an PCIe 3.0 interface with 1 to 4 lanes where 1 GB/s data can be provided per lane. There are multiple form factors that feature different PCIe lane counts. One of the goals is to unify the ecosystem of removable storage by being compatible with standards already widely adopted, such as PCIe and NVMe. There already is a wide range of controllers, software and devices that uses these standards, accelerating adoption.

History 

On 7 September 2016, the CompactFlash Association announced CFexpress. The specification would be based on the PCI Express interface and NVM Express protocol.

On 18 April 2017 the CompactFlash Association published the CFexpress 1.0 specification. Version 1.0 will use the XQD form-factor (38.5 mm × 29.8 mm × 3.8 mm) with two PCIe 3.0 lanes for speeds up to 2 GB/s. NVMe 1.2 is used for low-latency access, low overhead and highly parallel access.

On 13 June 2017, Delkin introduced the first CFexpress cards based on the CFexpress 1.0 specification. In February 2018, they released benchmarks, with sample units introduced in the second quarter of 2018, and production scheduled for the third quarter.

The CFexpress 2.0 standard was announced on 28 February 2019. It features two new card formats ("type A", one lane, more compact and "type C", four lanes, bigger and thicker, up to 4 GB/s), with the existing cards designated as "type B". The NVM Express protocol was upgraded to 1.3.

In the future, there are plans to increase the speed further by adopting PCIe 4.0.  CFexpress 2.0 type B Gen4 Cards are basically already available in the form of the Seagate Storage Expansion Card for Xbox Series X|S, which are mechanically incompatible to most slots because of their lengthened housing.

Comparison

Form Factors 
CFexpress supports the following card sizes.  The second column lists the oldest CFexpress version
that includes the form factor.

The larger form factors have more electrical contacts, allowing more PCIe lanes to be used.
Form factor B has the same size and contacts as an XQD card, allowing a single card slot to accept both XQD and CFexpress-B cards.

Compatible devices

Cards

Delkin 
On 13 June 2017, Delkin introduced the first CFexpress cards, which were on the CFexpress 1.0 specification. The cards have a XQD form factor and use two PCIe 3.0 lanes. They come in 32 GB, 64 GB, 128 GB and 256 GB capacities.

More details on Delkin's CFexpress cards were revealed in February 2018. The cards should be able to be read from and written to with respectively up to 1.6 GB/s and up to 1.0 GB/s benchmarked with CrystalDiskMark 5.2.1. Sample units will be available in Q2 2018 and production is scheduled for Q3 2018.

Delkin's 512 GB Power CFexpress Type B card was reviewed along with several others in the early fall of 2020. Camnostic.com rated it the recommended buy due to generally doing well in its tests, but also because it was the cheaper of the alternatives. The article mentioned a firmware upgrade to address compatibility with the Canon EOS R5 camera in late September 2020.

ProGrade Digital 
ProGrade Digital announced it would begin production and sale of CFexpress cards in 2018 with the Type-B form-factor (the same as XQD).
The 1 TB CFexpress card that ProGrade Digital showed at the Spring NAB show in 2018 demonstrated 1,400 Mbit/s (Mbyte/sec?)read speed and over 700 Mbit/s (Mbyte/sec?)burst write speed.  This demonstration was performed using a Thunderbolt 3 CFexpress/XQD reader on a MacBook Pro computer.

Apacer 
On 11 December 2018, Apacer announced its first CFexpress card, the PV130-CFX.

Wise Advanced 
On 7 April 2019, Wise Advanced announced it was producing CFexpress cards with 512GB, 256GB, and 128GB capacities, as well as a CFexpress Card Reader, all using CFexpress Type B.

Readers

CFexpress Type A 
Sony MRW-G2

CFexpress Type B 
BLACKJET TX-1CXQ

Sony MRW-G1

Delkin CF Express Reader (DDREADER-54)

SanDisk Professional PRO-READER CFexpress

Angelbird CFexpress Card Reader MK2 | Type B

Lexar Professional CFexpress Type B USB 3.1 Reader

Lexar Professional CFexpress Type B USB 3.2 Gen 2×2 Reader

Parts 

On October 2, 2017, Rego Electronics announced CFexpress host connectors and card cardkits, parts that manufacturers can use for their CFexpress devices and cards.

Client devices 
As of October 2017, there were no CFexpress client devices released. However, in late October 2017 a Lexar employee stated to Nikon Rumors:CFExpress is essentially the next revision of XQD, and there should be full backward compatibility with XQD, and that getting D4/D5/500/D850’s to work with CFE cards should be a simple software patch.

On 23 August 2018, Nikon announced their new mirrorless cameras, the Z6 and Z7. At launch they only supported XQD cards, but a later firmware update enabled support for CFexpress. On 13 February 2019, Nikon further confirmed that CFexpress support via a firmware update will also be coming to the D5, D850 and D500. On 16 December 2019, Nikon released firmware version 2.20 for the Z6 and Z7, adding support for CFExpress. In December 2020, Nikon released firmware version 1.20 for the Nikon D850 DSLR that added support from CFexpress-B in the camera's XQD slot.

On 28 August 2018, Phase One announced the XF IQ4 camera system (three bodies). Like the Nikon cameras, future support for CFexpress was added in a later firmware update.

On 24 October 2019, Canon announced the development of the EOS-1D X Mark III with dual CFexpress slots. The camera was officially released on 6 January 2020, with availability set for February.

On 12 February 2020, Nikon announced the Nikon D6, which uses dual CFexpress slots.

On 20 April 2020, Canon announced that the EOS R5, a hybrid mirrorless camera, will support CFexpress and SD UHS-II.

On 28 July 2020, Sony announced the α7S III, a mirrorless camera that will support dual CFexpress Type A and SD cards.

On 26 January 2021, Sony announced the α 1, a mirrorless camera that will support dual CFexpress Type A and SD cards.

On 23 February 2021, Sony announced the FX3, a mirrorless camera that will support dual CFexpress Type A and SD cards.

On November 10, 2020, Microsoft launched the Xbox Series X and Series S with a slot for semi-proprietary Expansion Cards based on a CFexpress Type B form factor. These Cards only support PCIe Gen4. 

On 21 October 2021, Sony announced the α7 IV, a mirrorless camera that will support single CFexpress Type A and SD cards.

On 28 October 2021, Nikon announced the Nikon Z 9 flagship mirrorless camera, which uses dual CFexpress Type B slots.

See also 
 CompactFlash
 Memory cards
 PCI Express
 NVM Express
 XQD card

References 

Solid-state computer storage media
Computer standards